The 2008–09 Bulgarian Cup was the 27th official Bulgarian annual football tournament. The competition started on October 15, 2008 with the preliminary round and ended on May 26, 2009. The defending champions were Litex Lovech, who successfully defended their title against Pirin Blagoevgrad.

Preliminary round
In this round entered 4 winners from the regional competitions as well as 3 teams from B Group (second level) decided by random draw. There should have been 4 teams selected from B Group, but since this year's league features only 31 team, 3 teams were chosen. The matches were played on 15 October 2008.

|-
!colspan=3 style="background-color:#D0F0C0;" |15 October 2008

|}
Note: Roman numerals in brackets denote the league tier the clubs participate in during the 2008–09 season.

First round
In this round entered winners from the previous round together with the remaining 28 teams from B Group. The matches were played on 29 October 2008.

|-
!colspan=3 style="background-color:#D0F0C0;" |29 October 2008

|}

Second round
This round featured winners from the first round and all 16 teams from A Group. The matches were played on 11, 12, 13 and 26 November 2008.

|-
!colspan=3 style="background-color:#D0F0C0;" |11 November 2008

|-
!colspan=3 style="background-color:#D0F0C0;" |12 November 2008

|-
!colspan=3 style="background-color:#D0F0C0;" |13 November 2008

|-
!colspan=3 style="background-color:#D0F0C0;" |26 November 2008

|-
!colspan=3 style="background-color:#D0F0C0;" |3 December 2008

|}

Third round
In this round entered winners from the second round. The matches were played on 7 December 2008.

|-
!colspan=3 style="background-color:#D0F0C0;" |7 December 2008

|}

Quarter-finals

Semi-finals

Final

External links
 bulgarian-football.com 

Bulgarian Cup seasons
Bulgarian Cup, 2008-09
Cup